Yaanum Theeyavan is a 2017 Indian Tamil action crime thriller film written and directed by debut director Prashanth G. Sekar. The film is based on a number of true events collectively. Prashanth G. Sekar is a former assistant director of director Hari in Singam II and director Vignesh Shivan in the film Podaa Podi. The casting of the movie includes newcomer Ashwin Jerome along with Varsha Bollamma and Raju Sundaram in primary roles. The cinematography of the movie is done by Shreyaas Krishna, who also did it for Jil Jung Juk. The music is composed by Achu Rajamani. The film was released on 30 June 2017.

Plot
This movie claims to represent a number of true events that have actually happened. Put together under one shell with imaginative screenplay and characters, and the story revolves around three primary characters: Michael (Ashwin Jerome), Soumya (Varsha Bollamma), and Pasupathy (Raju Sundaram). The plot forms around how these three characters meet and what happens after their meeting.

Cast

 Ashwin Jerome as Michael (Mike)
 Varsha Bollamma as Soumya
 Raju Sundaram as Pasupathy
 Ponvannan as Jayaprakash
 VTV Ganesh as Sundaramurthi
 Santhana Bharathi as Sethuramalingam
 Jangiri Madhumitha as Madhu
 Arunraja Kamaraj as Arun
 Boys Rajan as Soumya's father
 Meera Krishnan as Soumya's mother
 Kaajal Pasupathi as Prostitute
 L. Raja as Manimaran
 Madhan Kodees as Sada
 Pari Elavazhagan as Pipe Prakash
 Hello Kandasamy as Sethuramalingam's assistant

Production
After a lot of hunting for the roles of Pasupathy and Soumya, Raju Sundaram and Varsha were respectively fixed. The movie went on floors on 22 July 2015. It was shot extensively for two schedules from July till September 2015 in and around Chennai, most of it in and around Chromepet. The shooting was wrapped up on 14 September 2015. The movie in total has 5 songs pictured.  Lyricists Kabilan and Mani Amuthavan have penned two songs each, and the composer Achu Rajamani himself has written a song. The movie is completely packed and ready for release. The movie will be released worldwide on June 30, 2017. It's reported that Raju Sundaram is playing as a serial killer in this flick.

Soundtrack
Music was composed by Achu Rajamani.
"Nenjukkulle" - Suchith Suresan
"Nila Nila" - Jithin Raj, Swetha Menon
"Yaanum Theeyavan" - Achu
"Aagaayame" - Yaamini

Critical reception
The Hindu wrote, "We expect this remarkably bland love story to turn into a thriller. But no such luck." Deccan chronicle wrote "The problem with the script is an ordinary story with underdeveloped characters. The director could have infused more thrilling elements to hold the tension. The movie had all the potential to become an engaging thriller had the director concentrated more on a coherent screenplay with solid writing." Baradwaj Rangan of Film Companion wrote, "With better writing, Yaanum Theeyavan could have been something, but it’s still not dismissible, if only because the director believes in using the camera to tell his tale."

References

2017 films
2017 directorial debut films
2010s Tamil-language films
2017 crime action films
2017 action thriller films
Indian crime action films
Indian action thriller films
Films scored by Achu Rajamani
Films shot in Chennai